Sword Stained with Royal Blood is a 1981 Hong Kong film produced by the Shaw Brothers Studio, directed by Chang Cheh and starring the Venom Mob. The film was based on the novel of the same name by Louis Cha. The film was one of the rarest Venom martial arts film available, and has been digitally remastered and released by Celestial Pictures.

Plot
The story begins with the exile of a young boy who grows up to meet his destiny as a great warrior. After his father, a Han loyalist and hero, is betrayed by the Emperor and sentenced to death, Yuan Chengzhi is spirited away to the reclusive master of the Lung Yau school of martial arts. Having grown into a righteous young man of considerable martial skill, Yuan sets out on his own. He discovers the hideout of a long-dead martial arts master known as Golden Snake Xia Xueyi and lays claim to his buried martial arts manual, sword, and collection of darts. He also discovers the whereabouts of a lost treasure and instructions to deliver a portion of it to a certain woman. Cheng-chih sets out to find her in order to honor the dead man's wishes and ends up meeting a spoiled and not-so-cleverly disguised young woman posing as a man named Wen Qingqing. It's enough to fool the naive Yuan Chengzhi, who befriends Wen after she takes a liking to him. She brings him into her household, which is home to a wealthy clan of martial artists known for their mastery of the Five Element Array. Yuan's stay grows unsettling, first when jealous quarreling sparked by his presence erupts between Wen and her cousin. Things get a lot more complicated when a trio of angry martial artists storm the household and accuse Wen of theft. It turns out that they are members of Yuan's school and just as the situation threatens to turn into a full-scale battle, he intercedes in order to find a peaceful solution. As a result of his intervention, Yuan's skills draw the attention of the master of the house, who recognizes the kung fu techniques of his arch-enemy. As hidden truths about the Wen clan and their dark part are revealed through flashbacks, Yuan finds himself forced to fight their infamous Five Element Array in order to complete his quest and escape in one piece.

Cast
Philip Kwok as Yuan Chengzhi
Wen Hsueh-erh as Wen Qingqing
Lung Tien-hsiang as Xia Xueyi
Ching Li as Wen Yi
Chiang Sheng as Wen Zheng
Wang Li as Wen Fangshan
Lu Feng as Wen Nanyang
Yu Tai-ping as Wen Beiyang
Chu Ke as Wen Fang
Chao Kuo as Cui Ximin
Siao Yuk as Mei Jianhe
Zhang Chiung-yu as Sun Zhongjun
Chu Tit-wo as Huang Zhen
Kwan Fung as Wen Fangda
Jim Sum as Rong Cai
Wang Hua as Mute
Li Shouqi as Mu Renqing
Wang Ching-ho as Taoist Musang
Ng Hong-sang as Wen Fangshi
Keung Hon as Wen Fangwu
Lui Hong as Wen Yi's mother

External links

Films based on works by Jin Yong
Hong Kong martial arts films
Shaw Brothers Studio films
Works based on Sword Stained with Royal Blood
Wuxia films
Films set in 17th-century Ming dynasty
Films directed by Chang Cheh
1980s Hong Kong films